Tokyo Majin is a Japanese anime series, which premiered in Japan on the anime satellite TV network Animax. A large part of the Tokyo Majin Gakuen franchise, it is loosely based on a series of Japan-only video games, and is directed by Shinji Ishihira. The first season,  originally aired on January 19, 2007, and ended on April 20, 2007. All of the episodes in the season are called the 'Dark Arts Chapters' (外法編 Gehou-hen). A second season, titled  originally aired on July 27, 2007 to October 12, 2007. Its first five episodes are called the 'Martial Fist Chapters' (拳武編 Kenbu-hen), its next five episodes are called the 'Stars of Fate Chapters' (宿星編 Shukusei-hen), and the last two episodes are called 'Extra Chapters' (番外編 Bangai-hen). The 'Extra' episodes do not run in the chronological timeline of the story, but are flashbacks and fillers.

Funimation published the DVDs in 2 boxsets. The First boxset Tokyo Majin-Part One, Dark Arts Chapters. The Second boxset Tokyo Majin-Part Two, Martial Fist Chapters, which showed the two story arcs and two extras. American television network Chiller began airing the series as part of their Anime Wednesdays block on July 15, 2015.

Episode list

Season 1

Season 2

References

External links

Tokyo Majin